Cnemaspis peninsularis, also known as the peninsular rock gecko, is a species of gecko from southern Peninsular Malaysia and Singapore.

References

Further reading
Goldberg, Stephen R., Charles R. Bursey, and L. Lee Grismer. "Gastrointestinal helminths of nine species of Cnemaspis (Squamata: Gekkonidae) from Peninsular Malaysia, one species from Cambodia and Thailand and two species from Vietnam." Journal of Natural History 49.43-44 (2015): 2683–2691.
Amarasinghe, AA Thasun, et al. "A New Species of Cnemaspis (Reptilia: Gekkonidae) from Sumatra, Indonesia." Herpetologica 71.2 (2015): 160–167.

Cnemaspis
Reptiles described in 2014
Reptiles of Malaysia
Reptiles of Singapore